Mooka Dhaatu is a science fiction novel by Dr. K. N. Ganeshaiah. It is a thriller which relates God, science, religion, desire, civilization, selfishness, life, DNA, selfish gene theory, and evolutionary theory.

References

Kannada novels